The 1998 Wyoming gubernatorial election took place on November 3, 1998. Incumbent Republican Jim Geringer ran successfully for re-election to a second term as Governor of Wyoming, defeating Democratic nominee John Vinich.

Republican primary

Candidates
Jim Geringer, incumbent Governor
Bill Taliaferro, rancher

Democratic primary

Candidates
Keith Goodenough, State Senator
Phil Roberts, attorney and professor at the University of Wyoming
John Vinich, State Senator

Results

References

Wyoming
1998
Gubernatorial